KME may refer to:

 Kaplan–Meier estimator,estimates the fraction of patients living for a certain amount of time after treatment.
 Kappa Mu Epsilon
 KME Group, Italian company
 Kovatch Mobile Equipment Corp
 , a conglomerate of microelectronic design and development facilities around the VEB Mikroelektronik "Karl Marx" Erfurt (MME) in the former East Germany